This article is a comparison of data modeling tools which are notable, including standalone, conventional data modeling tools and modeling tools supporting data modeling as part of a larger modeling environment.

General

Features

See also 
 Comparison of database tools
 List of Unified Modeling Language tools
 Data modeling
 IDEF1X

Data modeling tools
Data modeling tools